Yukika (written: 來可 or 雪香) is a feminine Japanese given name. Notable people with the name include:

, Japanese scholar and the founder of the Association for Aid and Relief
, Japanese actress, singer, model and voice actress

Japanese feminine given names